The year 1642 in music involved some significant events.

Events
Bartolomeo Montalbano becomes Kapellmeister at San Francesco in Bologna.

Publications
Christoph Demantius –  for five voices (Freiberg: Georg Beuther), written for the funeral of Hedwig on May 30
Claudio Monteverdi – 
Nicodemo Parisi –  (Venice: Bartolomeo Magni), collected by his brother, Filippo Parisi, and including two of his compositions
Johann Rist –  (Hamburg: Jacob Rebenlein), a collection of pastoral songs, music by Heinrich Pape

Popular music
Jean de Brébeuf – "Huron Carol" (Canada's oldest Christmas song)

Classical music
Cornelis Padbrué – Synphonia in nuptias..., written for the wedding of Mathaeus Steyn and Maria van Napels

Opera
 Francesco Cavalli – Amore innamorato
 Claudio Monteverdi – L'incoronazione di Poppea
 Luigi Rossi – Il Palazzo incantato

Births
 11 January – Johann Friedrich Alberti, German composer and organist
 23 September – Giovanni Maria Bononcini, Italian composer (died 1678)
 6 December – Johann Christoph Bach, composer (died 1703)
date unknown – Benedictus Buns, Dutch composer

Deaths
date unknown
Giovanni Battista Buonamente, Italian composer and violinist (born c.1595)
Johann Daniel Mylius, composer for the lute (born c.1583)
probable – Nicolas Vallet, lutenist and composer (born c.1583)

References